Artur Pikk (born 5 March 1993) is an Estonian professional footballer who plays as a left-back for I liga club Odra Opole and the Estonia national team.

Club career

Levadia
Levadia acquired Pikk's player rights in 2009. In 2011, he joined Tammeka on a one-and-a-half year loan. Pikk made his debut in the Meistriliiga on 2 April 2011, in a 1–1 home draw against Narva Trans. He made 39 appearances and scored one goal for Tammeka before returning to Levadia. Pikk made his debut for Levadia on 23 July 2012, in a 6–0 away win over Tallinna Kalev. He helped the team win the league title in the 2013 season. On 15 December 2013, Pikk signed a contract extension with Levadia until 2015. He helped the club to their second successive Meistriliiga title in the 2014 season.

BATE Borisov
On 23 February 2016, Pikk signed a three-year contract with Belarusian champions BATE Borisov. He won the 2016 Belarusian Super Cup on his debut for the club. Pikk helped BATE Borisov win their 11th successive Belarusian Premier League title in the 2016 season. On 30 August 2017, his contract was terminated.

Ružomberok
On 17 October 2017, Pikk signed with Fortuna Liga club Ružomberok until May 2018.

Miedź Legnica
On 11 July 2018, Pikk signed for Ekstraklasa club Miedź Legnica on a two-year deal.

International career

Pikk has represented Estonia at under-17, under-18, under-19 and under-21 levels. He was named in the Estonia under-19 squad for the 2012 UEFA European Under-19 Championship in Estonia. Pikk played in every group stage match, but failed to help the team progress to the semi-finals as Estonia lost all three games against Portugal, Greece and Spain.

Pikk made his senior international debut for Estonia on 7 June 2014, in a 2–1 home win over Tajikistan in a friendly. He made his first start for Estonia on 12 October 2014, in a UEFA Euro 2016 qualifying match against England while performing his compulsory military service in the Estonian Defence Forces. The match ended in a 0–1 loss. Pikk scored his first international goal on 11 November 2015, in a 3–0 home win over Georgia in a friendly.

Career statistics

Club

International

International goals
As of match played 20 July 2019. Estonia score listed first, score column indicates score after each Pikk goal.

Honours

Club
HaServ
Estonian Small Cup: 2009

Levadia
Meistriliiga: 2013, 2014
Estonian Cup: 2013–14
Estonian Supercup: 2013, 2022

BATE Borisov
Belarusian Premier League: 2016, 2017
Belarusian Super Cup: 2016

RFS
Latvian Higher League: 2021
Latvian Football Cup: 2021

References

External links

1993 births
Living people
Sportspeople from Tartu
Estonian footballers
Association football defenders
Esiliiga players
Meistriliiga players
Belarusian Premier League players
Slovak Super Liga players
Ekstraklasa players
Veikkausliiga players
Nemzeti Bajnokság I players
Latvian Higher League players
I liga players
FCI Levadia Tallinn players
FCI Levadia U21 players
Tartu JK Tammeka players
FC BATE Borisov players
MFK Ružomberok players
Miedź Legnica players
Kuopion Palloseura players
Diósgyőri VTK players
FK RFS players
Odra Opole players
Estonia youth international footballers
Estonia under-21 international footballers
Estonia international footballers
Estonian expatriate footballers
Expatriate footballers in Belarus
Expatriate footballers in Slovakia
Expatriate footballers in Poland
Expatriate footballers in Hungary
Expatriate footballers in Finland
Expatriate footballers in Latvia
Estonian expatriate sportspeople in Belarus
Estonian expatriate sportspeople in Slovakia
Estonian expatriate sportspeople in Poland
Estonian expatriate sportspeople in Hungary
Estonian expatriate sportspeople in Finland
Estonian expatriate sportspeople in Latvia